Vukajlo Božović (d. 1926), known as Priest Vukajlo (поп Вукајло) was a Serbian Orthodox priest and revolutionary. Božović participated in the Balkan Wars, as a commander of a detachment in Ibarski Kolašin. He was the father of writer Grigorije Božović.

First Balkan War

During the Serbian mobilization of the First Balkan War, the Chetnik detachments of the Serbian 3rd Army included: Medveđa, colon headed by captain Dušan Sekulić, Ljubomir Vulović and Nikodim Racić (Lisica-Prapaštice-Priština), and colon headed by Božin Simić (Svirci-Novo Brdo-Kačanik); Kuršumlija, under the command of captain and Chetnik vojvoda Vojislav Tankosić and captain Dragutin Nikolić (Kuršumlija-Merdare-Malo Kosovo-Štimlje-Crnoljeva-Prizren-Ljuma); Lukovo, under the command of captain Pavle Blažarić (Lukovo-Madljika-Drenica); and Kolašin, under the command of prota Vukajlo Božović. Alongside these detachments, were two smaller ones located at the front of the Ibar Army, the first headed by reserve lieutenant Panta Miladinović, the second headed by Chetnik vojvoda Živko Gvozdić. The commander of all these detachments was major Alimpije Marjanovic.

See also
 List of Chetnik voivodes
Rista K. Popović (1870–1917), priest and fighter
Jevto Popović, priest and fighter
Prokopije Vujišić, priest and fighter
Jovan Grković-Gapon, priest and fighter
Stevan Dimitrijević, priest and fighter
Mihailo Petrović, priest and fighter

Annotations
Full name: Vukajlo N. Božović

References

Sources

1926 deaths
People from Zubin Potok
Military personnel from Mitrovica, Kosovo
Kosovo Serbs
Chetniks
Serbian Orthodox clergy
Armed priests
Serb priests
Royal Serbian Army soldiers
20th-century Eastern Orthodox clergy
Serbian military personnel of the Balkan Wars
Serbian military personnel of World War I
20th-century Serbian people
Year of birth missing